"Give Me All Your Love" is a song recorded by German Eurodance band Magic Affair. It is the follow-up single to their acclaimed song "Omen III", and was released in 1994 via Cologne Dance Label as the second single from their debut studio album, Omen (The Story Continues...) (1994). It also broke away from the Omen theme and was a more pop-oriented track. The single was successful in many European countries, peaking at number three in Finland, number four in Denmark and number eight in both Sweden and Switzerland. In Germany, it peaked at number six and was certified gold for 250,000 records sold. German Sales stood at 400,000 copies in 1995. On the Eurochart Hot 100, "Give Me All Your Love" reached number 14. Rap parts are performed by AK Swift, and lead vocals by Franca Morgano.

Music video
The accompanying music video for "Give Me All Your Love" was directed by Czar and was A-listed on Germany's VIVA in May 1994.

Track listing

Credits
Co-producer – Breiter (tracks: 1 2), Kempf (tracks: 1 2)
Design – Udo Poppinga, X-Space
Lyrics – Swift, Breiter (tracks: 1 2), Kempf (tracks: 1 2)
Music – Breiter (tracks: 1 2), Kempf (tracks: 1 2)
Producer – Mike Staab

Notes
Tracks 1, 2: Recorded and mixed at BK Studio 
Published by Edition Nosferatu/BK Verlag 
Track 3: Recorded and mixed at Homeland Studios N.B. FFm 
Published by Edition Nosferatu
Many Thanks to: Silke, Uli, Jesse B, M. Hosp, Blow and Traumi, Tillmann Uhrmacher. 
Special Thanks to: Helmut Fest, Erwin Bach, Donald Valbert, Thomas Weber, Bodo Krohn, Friedhelm Kaulen, Jörg Klaudies. 
Many special Thanks to: Ully Jonas, Peter Power, Marco Quirini, Monika Marcowitz, Charly Prick and VIVA Television for their outstanding support on OMEN III.
From the forthcoming Album: Omen (The Story Continues...)

Charts

Weekly charts

Year-end charts

Certifications

References

External links

1994 singles
1994 songs
EMI Records singles
English-language German songs
Magic Affair songs
Music videos directed by Czar (director)